This is a list of movies set or partially set in the U.S. state of New Jersey:

 13th Child (2002) - story is based on The Jersey Devil by James F. McCloy and Ray Miller Jr.; film was shot in New Jersey at Wharton State Forest, Batsto Village, and Hammonton in the Pine Barrens
 According to Greta (2009) - Ocean Grove, NJ - Asbury Park, NJ - Brick Township, NJ - Neptune, NJ - Point Pleasant, NJ
 Across the Universe (2007) - Princeton University Campus
 The Addams Family (2019)
 The Adventures of Buckaroo Banzai Across the 8th Dimension (1984)
 A.I. Artificial Intelligence (2001)
 Alice, Sweet Alice (1976)
 American Gangster (2007)
 American Hustle (2013)
 The Amityville Horror (1979) - partially filmed in Toms River
 Analyze That (2002)
 Analyze This (1999) - partially filmed in Hoboken, Jersey City, Montclair
 Annie (1982)
 Aqua Teen Hunger Force Colon Movie Film for Theaters (2007)
 Artie Lange's Beer League (2006)
 Atlantic City (1980)
 Avengers: Endgame (2019) 
 Baby It's You (1983)
 Bad Company (2002)
 Ball of Fire (1941): mostly set in NYC, the inn where the main characters stay is in Kingston, New Jersey; their expected wedding venue is in Rancocas.
 Bathing Beauty (1944)
 Be Kind Rewind (2008)
 A Beautiful Mind (2001)
 Before I Self Destruct (2009)
 Being John Malkovich (1999) - "You see the world through John Malkovich's eyes. Then after about 15 minutes, you're spit out into a ditch on the side of the New Jersey Turnpike!"
 Big (1988) - parts were filmed in Cliffside Park
 Blinded by the Light (2019) - scenes set/filmed in Freehold and Asbury Park
 Bogus (1996)
 The Bounty Hunter (2010) - filmed partially in Atlantic City
 Brainscan (1994)
 Brewster's Millions (1985)
 Broadway Danny Rose (1984)
 Burn After Reading (2008) - partially filmed in Paramus (gym scenes - Route 17)
 The Cartel (2010)
 Caught (1996) - Jersey City
 Chasing Amy (1997)
 Cheaper by the Dozen (1950)
 Cinderella Man (2005)
 City by the Sea (2002) - Asbury Park
 City of Hope (1991) - takes place in fictitious Hudson City, New Jersey
 Class of Nuke 'Em High (1986)
 Clean and Sober (1988) - stars Michael Keaton and Kathy Baker; directed by Ron Howard; partially filmed in Gloucester City
 Clerks (1994) 
 Clerks II (2006) 
 The Color of Money (1986)
 Coneheads (1993)
 Confessions of a Teenage Drama Queen (2004)
 The Cookout (2004)
 Cop Land (1997)
 Cosmopolitan (2003)
 Coyote Ugly (2000) - was given the name 'Jersey' because she was originally from South Amboy
 The Crew (2000)
Da Hip Hop Witch (2000)
 Dan in Real Life (2007)
 The Dark Knight Rises (2012) - Newark 
 Dark Ride (2006) - took place in Asbury Park
 The Day the Earth Stood Still (2008)
 Desperately Seeking Susan (1985)
 Dogma (1999)
 Donnie Brasco (1997)  Clifton
 Down the Shore (2011)
 Duane Hopwood (2005)
 Eddie and the Cruisers (1983)
 Eddie and the Cruisers II: Eddie Lives! (1989)
 Elizabethtown
 Empire Records (1995)
 Escape From New York (1981) - opening scene is supposed to be Bayonne
 Fallen (1998) - Mullica Twp. 
 The Family Man (2000)
 The Family Stone  (2005) - Madison
 Firstborn (1984)
 Flight 93 (2006)
 Forget About It (2006) - primarily filmed in Hoboken
 Frame of Mind (2009) - Carlstadt
 Frankenhooker (1990)
 Freedomland (2006)
 The Freshman (1990) - ending of movie is supposed to take place in Cherry Hill
 Friday the 13th (1980) - set in fictional Crystal Lake Camp, NJ; filmed in Blairstown, at No-Be-Bo-Sco camp
 Friday the 13th (2009)
 Funny Money (2006)
 Garden State (2004)
 Girl Most Likely (2012)
 The Godfather: Part III (1990)
 Gone Fishin' (1997)
 Goodbye, Columbus (1969)
 Gracie (2007)
 Greetings from the Shore (2007) - based and shot in Lavallette
 Guess Who (2005)
 Gunshy (1998)
 Gypsy 83 (2004)
 Happiness (1998) - "You know, people are always putting New Jersey down. None of my friends can believe I live here. But that's because they don't get it: I'm living in a state of irony."
 Harold & Kumar Go to White Castle (2004)
 Hellboy (2004)
 Homeboy (1988)
 Hudson Hawk (1991)
 The Hurricane (1999)
 Hysterical Blindness (2002) - takes place in Bayonne
 The Iceman (2012)
 Imaginary Heroes (2004)
 I.Q. (1994)
 In & Out (1997) - Clinton, Montclair, Pompton Lakes, and other North Jersey locations
 The In-Laws (1979)
 Jaws - takes place in the small New England beach resort of Amity Island, but was based on the true story of a great white shark which terrorized the shores of New Jersey in the summer of 1916
 Jay and Silent Bob Strike Back (2001)
 Jersey Boys (2014)
 Jersey Girl (1992) - starring Jami Gertz and Dylan McDermott
 Jersey Girl (2004) - directed by Kevin Smith, starring Ben Affleck
 Jersey Shore Shark Attack (2012)
 The Jimmy Show (2002)
 Joe the King (1999)
 Julie & Julia (2009) - Hoboken
 Just Friends (2005)
 Just The Ticket (1999) - Roselle Park
 The Kill-Off (1990)
 The King of Marvin Gardens (1972)
 Lansdown (2002)
 The Last Broadcast (1998)
 Lean on Me (1989) Paterson
 The Lemon Sisters (1990)
 Lianna (1983)
 Little Black Book (2004)
 Live Free or Die Hard (2007) 
 Lock Up (1989)
 Loins of Punjab Presents (2007)
 The Long Kiss Goodnight (1996) - "Easy, sport. Got myself out of Beirut once, I think I can get out of New Jersey." "Yeah, well don't be so sure. Others have tried and failed. The entire population, in fact."
 Mafioso (1962) - North Bergen
 Mallrats (1995)
  Meet Me in the Ironbound (2015)
 Men in Black (1997)
 Morning Glory (2010)
 Mortal Thoughts (1991)
 Moving (1988)
 The Nanny Diaries - Annie is a graduate of Montclair University
 National Treasure (2004)
 New Jersey Drive (1995)
 New Jersey: The Movie (2009)
 Nick and Norah's Infinite Playlist (2008)
 North (1994)
 Not Fade Away (2012)
 Nothing But Trouble (1991)
 Now You Know (2002)
 Ocean's Eleven (2001) - Danny Ocean is released from a prison in New Jersey
 Old Dogs (2009) - partially filmed in Hoboken (Dan's apartment)
 On The Waterfront (1954) - filmed in Hoboken, set in Brooklyn
 One for the Money (2012)
 Owning Mahowny (2003)
 Palookaville (1995)
 Paper Soldiers (2002)
 Paterson (2016)
 Paul Blart: Mall Cop (2009)
 The Perfect Holiday (2007) - set in Jersey Gardens Mall
 The Pick-up Artist (1987) - set in Atlantic City
 Picture Perfect (1997) - Hoboken and West Orange
 Pootie Tang (2001) - Old Bridge
 The Prowler (1981) - took place in the fictional town of Avalon Bay; filmed in Cape May
 The Purple Rose of Cairo (1985)
  Ragtime (1981) - Spring Lake; James Cagney's last film
 Raising Helen (2004)
 Ransom (1996) - filmed throughout Bergen County
 Restaurant (1998)
 Return of the Secaucus 7 (1980)
  Red River  (1998)
 Riding in Cars with Boys (2001) - East Orange (Upsala College) 
 Rocket Science (2007) - set in Plainsboro
 Rounders (1998)
 Running on Empty (1988)
 Running Scared (2006)
 Satan's Playground (2005)
 School of Rock (2003)
 Second Best (2004)
 The Secret Life of Walter Mitty (1947) - set in Perth Amboy
 Sherrybaby (2006)
 The Simian Line (2000)
 Snake Eyes (1998)
 Something Wild (1986)
 The Soprano State (2010)
 Spider-Man 3 (2007)
 Spider-Man: Far From Home (2019) - Towards the end of the movie, Peter Parker and his classmates land in Newark, NJ.
 Stardust Memories (1980) - filmed in Asbury Park, Belmar, Deal, Hoboken, Neptune City, Ocean Grove
 The Station Agent (2003)
 Stealing Home (1988)
 Storytelling (2001)
 Street Fight (2005)
 Superman (1978)
 Swimfan (2002)
 This Thing of Ours (2003)
 The Toxic Avenger (1984) and three sequels - "the first superhero from New Jersey"
 Trade (2007)
 Transformers: Revenge of the Fallen (2009) - Sam Witwicky (Shia LaBeouf) attends Princeton University
 Union City (1980)
 United 93 (2006) - flight departs from Newark International Airport
 Vision Quest (1985) - actually set in Spokane, WA, but the female lead says she's from Trenton
 Voices (1979) - mostly filmed in Hoboken; Amy Irving, Michael Ontkean
 Walking to the Waterline (1998)
 War of the Worlds (2005)
 The Wedding Singer (1998)
 Welcome to the Dollhouse (1995)
 Wild Hearts Can't Be Broken (1991)
 Win Win (2011)
 Winter Solstice (2004)
 Wise Guys (1986)
 The World According to Garp - scenes filmed in Denville movie theater and Madison City Hall
 World Trade Center (2006) - Clifton
 Ye Maaya Chesave (2010) - Princeton University at Princeton
 Zoolander - partially filmed in Ogdensburg

See also 
 Television and film in New Jersey
 List of television shows set in New Jersey
 List of movies based on location
 List of people from New Jersey
 Thomas Edison
 Kevin Smith
 New Jersey films

New Jersey